Birmingham Bears are an Australian rules football team in the city of Birmingham, England.  The Bears were set up in the Winter of 2008/2009 to play in the Aussie Rules UK Walkabout National League in 2009 under a 9-a-side format.

History 
The Bears played in their first season in 2009 having been formed at the end of season 2008. They played against teams such as Manchester Mosquitoes, Huddersfield Rams, Sheffield Thunder, Liverpool Eagles and Leeds Bombers.

The Bears played their first games at the Aussie Rules UK National Carnival in Newcastle on 9 May 2009. The Bears played against Huddersfield Rams in their first game, losing 54–19 with the club's first goal scored by Mathew Mitchell. The next game was against the Newcastle Centurions, the current Northern Premiers with the game finishing 42–0 in the opposition's favour. The third game was against the Chippenham Redbacks, featuring the England coach and the Welsh international captain. After a close start the final score was 35–8 to the Redbacks. The scheduled fourth game against Middlesbrough Hawks was won on forfeit after the Hawks refused to field a side. This saw the Bears finish 11th out of 12 in their first taste of Aussie Rules action.

In the 2009 season, Birmingham Bears finished 2nd in the ARUK Central England ladder, resulting in a 3rd vs. 2nd Preliminary Final versus Liverpool Eagles. Having won this match dominantly 147–42, the Bears ascended to their first ever Grand Final to be played in Huddersfield against the Huddersfield Rams. Despite leading going into the final quarter and ruckman Scott Alford being award best and fairest, the Bears were overcome by the Rams 105–84 to finish runners-up in a very successful opening season.

Season 2010 

Season 2010 was a time of rebuilding for the Bears. With the formation and success of the University of Birmingham Sharks Australian Football Club at the end of 2010, midfielder Tim Smith took over the reins from Mat Mitchell and will be the cornerstone for the revival of the Birmingham Bears in 2011.

Season 2011 

The Bears resumed training in January 2011 and will compete in the AFL Britain CNW (Central and North West) Division with old rivals Huddersfield, Liverpool and Leeds as well as the Wolverhampton Wolverines. The complete competition for Season 2011 is as follows:
| Manchester Mosquitoes
| Nottingham Scorpions
| Birmingham Bears
| Wolverhampton Wolverines
| Liverpool Eagles
| Huddersfield Rams
| Sheffield Thunder
| Peterborough Lightning
| Hull Monarchs
| Oxford Beavers

Fixtures & Results

Season 2012 
The Bears competed in the AFL Central and Northern England for the 2012 season. A somewhat disappointing season saw the bears narrowly miss out on finals as well as losing in the final as part of the West Midlands representative side in the Brit Cup.

Best and Fairest: Sean Walton

Most Improved: Jack Wood

Coaches Award: Adam Coxsell

Season 2013 
The 2013 season saw a change in leadership at the Bears with Adam Coxsell and Sean Walton taking over the reins. The Bears under the new leadership had a successful pre-season winning both the Leeds Lightning cup and the Nathan Blakely Movember Cup in Manchester. The Bears had a strong season making the finals where the narrowly lost to an Australian heavy Leeds Minotaurs in the semi-finals. The highlight of the season came in the Brit cup where the Bears where an integral part of the West Midlands representative side that lifted the Brit cup finally after 3 years of losing out in the final.

Best and Fairest: Inti Aburto

Most Improved: Sam Willatt

Coaches Award: Steven Maguirre

Past and Present Players

Grand Final Appearances 
Aussie Rules UK Central Division

2009 - Runners Up

Sporton Cup

2010 (Spring) - Runners Up

2011 - C&NW Lightning Cup (winners)

2012 - Movember Cup (winners)

See also 
Birmingham Bears AFL
Aussie Rules UK

References 

Australian rules football clubs in England
2008 establishments in England
Australian rules football clubs established in 2008